Žuniči (in older sources also Žuniče) is a settlement on the left bank of the Kolpa River in the Municipality of Črnomelj in the White Carniola area of southeastern Slovenia. The area is part of the traditional region of Lower Carniola and is now included in the Southeast Slovenia Statistical Region.

A small chapel in the settlement is dedicated to Saint Nicholas and belongs to the Parish of Preloka. It was built in the early 20th century.

References

External links

Žuniči on Geopedia

Populated places in the Municipality of Črnomelj
Serb communities in Slovenia